Yusuke Ueda (Japanese: 上田祐輔, Ueda Yusuke, born 20 October 1990 in Shizuoka Prefecture, Japan) is a Japanese footballer who currently plays for Wollongong Olympic of the Australian Illawarra Premier League as of 2016.

Career

Singapore
Engaged in a transfer to Albirex Niigata S of the Singapore Premier League for 2014.

Cambodia
Finalized a switch to Albirex Niigata subsidiary Albirex Niigata Phnom Penh for the rest of 2014.

Australia
He practiced with a Sydney National Premier Leagues side in winter 2015, Ueda was announced as a Wollongong Olympic athlete in 2016, with his contract renewed for the 2017 and 2018 seasons, producing hat-tricks in a 4-1 crushing of Port Kembla as well in a 3-0 trouncing of Albion Park White Eagles during 2017, also producing a brace to overpower Cringila Lions 2–0 on 28 April 2018.

References

External links 
 Ueda inspires Olympic success 
 Japanese Wikipedia Page 
 SportsTG Profile 
 at Soccerway

Association football people from Shizuoka Prefecture
Association football forwards
Living people
1990 births
Expatriate soccer players in Australia
Expatriate footballers in Singapore
Expatriate footballers in Cambodia
Albirex Niigata Singapore FC players
Singapore Premier League players
Kibi International University alumni
SP Kyoto FC players
Japanese footballers
Japanese expatriate sportspeople in Cambodia